The United Rentals 200 was a NASCAR Camping World Truck Series race that took place in the fall at Martinsville Speedway in Virginia. The race was first run in 2003 and was the first fall Truck Series race at Martinsville since the Kroger 250 moved from the fall to the spring in 1999.

In 2020, as part of schedule realignment, the fall race became the only Truck Series race at the track as NASCAR decided to give the track one Xfinity Series race instead. This schedule change was done in a swap with Richmond Raceway, which previously had two Xfinity Series races and zero Truck Series races and would now have one Xfinity Series race and one Truck Series race (which replaced the spring race at Martinsville).

In 2022, the fall Truck Series race at Martinsville was moved to the spring and there was no fall Truck Series race at the track for the first time since 2002.

History

Although winners of the NASCAR Cup Series races at Martinsville were given grandfather clocks in substitution of a race trophy, only the winners of the spring Truck Series race would also get a grandfather clock. That would change in 2010 as the winners of both Truck Series races at Martinsville got a grandfather clock.

In the 2013 race, Bubba Wallace became the first African American to win in a Truck Series race in series history and the first African American driver since 1963 to win a race in any of NASCAR's three national series. He won back-to-back races at Martinsville when he drove his Kyle Busch Motorsports truck to the win in the 2014 fall Martinsville race. That year, his truck number was changed from No. 54 to No. 34 for this one race as a tribute to fellow African American driver Wendell Scott being inducted into the NASCAR Hall of Fame a few months later.

The 2020 race was held at night and became the Truck Series' only annual visit to Martinsville. That year and in 2019, the NASCAR Hall of Fame was the title sponsor. United Rentals became the title sponsor of the fall Truck Series race at Martinsville in 2021, which was the last year the Truck Series held a race in the fall at the track.

Past winners

2010, 2019 and 2021: The race was extended due to a NASCAR overtime finish.

Multiple winners (drivers)

Multiple winners (teams)

Manufacturer wins

References

External links
 

2003 establishments in Virginia
 
NASCAR Truck Series races
Recurring sporting events established in 2003
Annual sporting events in the United States